Alison Ruth Sharrock (born 4 January 1963) is an English Classics scholar. She has been Professor of Classics at the University of Manchester since August 2000. In 2009, she gave the Stanford Memorial Lectures. Together with David Konstan of Brown University, she edits the series Oxford Studies in Classical Literature and Gender Theory published by Oxford University Press.

Career 
Alison Sharrock graduated in 1984 from the University of Liverpool with a Bachelor of Arts (BA) degree. She received her doctorate (PhD) from the University of Cambridge in 1988. She worked at Keele University from 1989 to 2000. During her current post as Professor of Classics at the University of Manchester, she was Head of the Division of Archaeology, Religions and Theology, Classics and Ancient History (ARC), and then Head of the Department of Classics, Ancient History, Archeology and Egyptology (CAHAE) in the School of Arts, Languages and Cultures. She specialises in Latin literature, particularly in feminist readings of comedy, elegy and epic. She also develops online support materials for teachers and learners of the Latin language.

Selected publications

Books as single author
 Reading Roman Comedy: Poetics and Playfulness in Plautus and Terence (The Stanford Memorial Lectures, 2009);  
 Fifty Key Classical Authors (Routledge Key Guides) (with Rhiannon Ash, 2001); 
 Seduction and Repetition in Ovid's Ars Amatoria II (1994);

Books as editor
 Lucretius: Poetry, Philosophy, Science (with Daryn Lehoux and A D Morrison, 2013);  
 The Art of Love: Bimillenial Essays on Ovid's Ars Amatoria and Remedia Amoris (with Roy K Gibson and Steven J Green, 2007); 
 Intratextuality: Greek and Roman Textual Relations (with Helen Morales, 2001);

Contributions to books
 'Gender and sexuality' in Cambridge Companion to Ovid (ed. Philip Hardie, 2002); 
 'Looking at looking: can you resist a reading?' in The Roman Gaze: Vision, Power, and the Body (ed. David Fredrick, 2002); 
 'Re(ge)ndering gender(ed) studies' in Gender and the Body in the Ancient Mediterranean, Gender and History (ed Maria Wyke, 1998);  
 'Warrior women in Roman epic' in Women and War in Antiquity (ed. Jacqueline Fabre-Serris and Alison Keith, 2015);  
'Channeled, Reformulated, and Controlled: Love Poetry from the Song of Songs to Aeneas and Dido' in 'Love and its Critics: From the Song of Songs to Shakespeare and Milton's Eden' (ed. Michael Bryson and Arpi Movsesian, 2017);

Articles
 'Womanufacture', Journal of Roman Studies 81, 1991, pp. 36–49.
 'Ovid and the politics of reading', Materiali e discussioni per l'analisi dei testi classici 33, 1994, pp. 97–122.
 'Genre and social class, or comedy and the rhetoric of self-aggrandisement' in Roman Drama and its Contexts (ed. Stavros Frangoulides, Stephen J Harrison and Gesine Manuwald, 2016);

Miscellaneous
 Obituary of Don Fowler in The Guardian, 1999

Notes

External links 
 Alison Sharrock's page at the University of Manchester 
 Alison Sharrock's presentation 'Online Training for Reading Latin'

1963 births
Living people
English classical scholars
Women classical scholars
Academics of the University of Manchester